Centralia is a city in Boone County in the U.S. state of Missouri. The population was 4,541 at the 2020 census, with an estimated population of 4,244 in 2018. A very small portion of the city lies in Audrain County.

The Boone County portion of Centralia (which forms the majority of the city) is part of the Columbia Metropolitan Statistical Area, while a small part in Audrain County is part of the Mexico Micropolitan Statistical Area.

Geography
Centralia is located at  (39.209657, -92.136300).

Demographics

2010 census
As of the census of 2010, there were 4,027 people, 1,601 households, and 1,063 families living in the city. The racial makeup of the city was 96.5% White, 1.0% African American, 0.4% Native American, 0.2% Asian, 0.5% from other races, and 1.3% from two or more races. Hispanic or Latino of any race were 1.6% of the population.

There were 1,601 households, of which 36.0% had children under the age of 18 living with them, 48.4% were married couples living together, 12.7% had a female householder with no husband present, 5.2% had a male householder with no wife present, and 33.6% were non-families. 28.3% of all households were made up of individuals, and 14.1% had someone living alone who was 65 years of age or older. The average household size was 2.47 and the average family size was 3.01.

The median age in the city was 38 years. 26.6% of residents were under the age of 18; 7.3% were between the ages of 18 and 24; 25.5% were from 25 to 44; 23% were from 45 to 64; and 17.7% were 66 years of age or older. The gender makeup of the city was 46.5% male and 53.5% female.

2000 census
As of the census of 2000, there were 3,774 people, 1,505 households, and 1,032 families living in the city. The population density was 1,492.0 people per square mile (575.9/km2). There were 1,648 housing units at an average density of 651.5 per square mile (251.5/km2). The racial makeup of the city was 97.11% White, 1.14% African American, 0.42% Native American, 0.08% Asian, 0.21% from other races, and 1.03% from two or more races. Hispanic or Latino of any race were 0.82% of the population.

There were 1,505 households, out of which 37.7% had children under the age of 18 living with them, 53.3% were married couples living together, 12.6% had a female householder with no husband present, and 31.4% were non-families. 27.7% of all households were made up of individuals, and 14.5% had someone living alone who was 65 years of age or older. The average household size was 2.45 and the average family size was 2.97.

In the city, the population was spread out, with 28.2% under the age of 18, 7.3% from 18 to 24, 27.9% from 25 to 44, 19.1% from 45 to 64, and 17.5% who were 65 years of age or older. The median age was 36 years. For every 100 females, there were 83.8 males. For every 100 females age 18 and over, there were 77.8 males.

The median income for a household in the city was $34,475, and the median income for a family was $40,671. Males had a median income of $30,399 versus $21,115 for females. The per capita income for the city was $17,583. About 2.8% of families and 4.5% of the population were below the poverty line, including 3.0% of those under age 18 and 8.0% of those age 65 or over.

Education 
The Centralia R-VI School District operates four schools: Chance Elementary School (grades PK-2), Centralia Intermediate School (grades 3-5), Chester Boren Middle School (grades 6-8), and Centralia High School (grades 9-12).  Centralia Intermediate School is the newest building of the four, having opened for classes in August 2009. It was constructed in order to deal with the district's increasing enrollment.  This new technology-rich building contains 15 classrooms, each with 12 computers.

The town has a lending library, the Centralia Public Library.

History

City Origin 
Centralia was laid out in 1857 and was named after its central location on the North Missouri Railroad from St. Louis to Ottumwa, Iowa, and from the fact that it was located near the center of a vast prairie between Mexico and Huntsville, and between Columbia and Paris.

Civil War 
On September 27, 1864, 22 unarmed Union soldiers returning home on leave were pulled from a train in Centralia and executed by Confederate bushwhackers under William T. "Bloody Bill" Anderson. A Union force pursuing the guerrillas was ambushed, and about 150 were killed; some were executed, and some were tortured first. Many of the bodies were mutilated, then stuffed with the remains of decaying cattle bones. The incident came to be known as the Centralia Massacre.

The A.B. Chance Company 
The A.B. Chance Company was founded in 1907 by Albert Bishop Chance. He invented the first practical earth anchor. The company played a vital role in the growth of Centralia. Over the course of nearly 120 years, Chance has delivered pole line hardware, switches, cutouts and fuse links in addition to anchors, foundations, hot line tools, fiberglass and rubber products to the world-wide electricity transmission and distribution industry. Acquired by Hubbell in 1994, the Chance brand is manufactured in Centralia, Missouri.

The company still plays a major role in Centralia's economy with employing 860 people.

Registered Historic Places

The following Centralia locations have been listed on the National Register of Historic Places:
 Albert Bishop Chance House and Gardens
 Chatol

Anchor Fest 

Due to Centralia's rich history in earth anchors, there is a yearly celebration traditionally held the weekend after Memorial Day. It is looked at as a great time of year to kick off the summer and have fun enjoying the rides, great food, funnel cakes, arts and crafts and of course live music. There is also a parade of high school bands, local organizations, tractors and classic cars.

Notable people
Albert Bishop Chance, inventor of the earth anchor, mayor, and founder of the A.B. Chance Company.

References

External links
 City of Centralia official website
 Centralia Area Chamber of Commerce
 Historic maps of Centralia in the Sanborn Maps of Missouri Collection at the University of Missouri

 

 
Cities in Audrain County, Missouri
Cities in Boone County, Missouri
Cities in Missouri
Cities in Columbia metropolitan area (Missouri)
Columbia metropolitan area (Missouri)
1857 establishments in Missouri